Chan Kwok-keung, JP (born 17 January 1946, in Huizhou, Guangdong, China) was the member of the Legislative Council of Hong Kong in 1998–2004 for the Labour constituency. He was the vice-chairman of the Hong Kong Wearing Apparel Industry Employees' General Union, under the pro-Beijing Hong Kong Federation of Trade Unions. He is also the member of the Democratic Alliance for Betterment of Hong Kong.

References

1942 births
Living people
Democratic Alliance for the Betterment and Progress of Hong Kong politicians
Hong Kong Federation of Trade Unions
HK LegCo Members 1998–2000
HK LegCo Members 2000–2004